Phil Klay (born 1983) is an American writer.  He won the National Book Award for fiction in 2014 for his first book-length publication, a collection of short stories, Redeployment. In 2014 the National Book Foundation named him a 5 under 35 honoree. His 2020 novel, Missionaries, was named as one of President Obama’s favorite books of the year as well as one of The Wall Street Journal's Ten Best Books of the Year. He was a United States Marine Corps officer from 2005 to 2009. In addition to other projects, he currently teaches in the MFA writing program at Fairfield University.

Early life
Klay grew up in Westchester, New York, the son of Marie-Therese F. Klay and William D. Klay. His family background included several examples of public service. His maternal grandfather was a career diplomat and his father a Peace Corps volunteer; for years his mother worked in international medical assistance. He attended Regis High School in New York City, graduating in 2001.

Education and military career
During the summer of 2004, while a student at Dartmouth College, where he played rugby and boxed, Klay attended Officer Candidate School in Quantico, Virginia. He graduated from Dartmouth College in 2005 and then joined the U.S. Marine Corps, where he was commissioned as a second lieutenant. He later explained that:

During the U.S. troop surge in Iraq, he served for thirteen months in Anbar province in Iraq from January 2007 to February 2008. He left the military in 2009 and then earned an M.F.A. in creative writing from Hunter College in 2011.

He described his time in the military as "a very mild deployment" as a Public Affairs Officer. He said that he wrote his collection of short stories based on his service and return to civilian life because:

He has objected to the way civilians distance themselves from military experience:

He has described how "the gap between public mythology and lived experience" even affects both veteran-civilian dialogue and the veteran self-perception: 

The culture, according to Klay, presents hurdles to communication and a shared understanding:

Writing career
Klay's collection of short stories, Redeployment, was published in March 2014. Writing in the Daily Beast, Brian Castner described the book "a clinic in the profanities of war". He wrote:

In the New York Times, Pulitzer Prize-winning journalist Dexter Filkins wrote that "Klay succeeds brilliantly, capturing on an intimate scale the ways in which the war in Iraq evoked a unique array of emotion, predicament and heartbreak.... Iraq comes across not merely as a theater of war but as a laboratory for the human condition in extremis. Redeployment is ... the best thing written so far on what the war did to people’s souls."

In November 2014, Klay won the National Book Award for fiction for his collection of short stories Redeployment. The judges described it as a "brutal, piercing sometimes darkly funny collection" that "stakes Klay's claim for consideration as the quintessential storyteller of America’s Iraq conflict." In his acceptance speech, he said: "I can't think of a more important conversation to be having — war's too strange to be processed alone. I want to thank everyone who picked up the book, who read it and decided to join the conversation." He was the first author to win the prize for his first book-length work of fiction since Julia Glass in 2002. He had been thought "something of a longshot" to win. The New York Times included Redeployment on its list of the "Ten Best Books of 2014", and it received the National Book Critics Circle's 2014 John Leonard Award given for a best first book in any genre. In 2015, he received the James Webb Award for fiction dealing with Marines or Marine Corps life from the Marine Corps Heritage Foundation for Redeployment. In June 2015, Redeployment received the W.Y. Boyd Literary Award for Excellence in Military Fiction from the American Library Association.

He has named Colum McCann, author of Let the Great World Spin, as his "mentor". Klay describes himself as a Catholic and "a fan of a lot of ... the great Catholic literature–Flannery O'Connor, Francois Mauriac, Graham Greene, Evelyn Waugh." He has said that "religion and the tradition of Catholic thought ... helps you ask the right kinds of questions about these issues... There's a type of religious sentiment that is very certain of the answers and very certain about what should be proselytized. And then there's another type of religious tradition which is really much more about ... doubt and working your way towards more and more difficult questions. And I think that's the tradition that appeals to me."

He is a contributor to Granta. He has also reviewed fiction for The New York Times, The Washington Post, and Newsweek. His stories have appeared in collections as well, including The Best American Non-Required Reading 2012 (Mariner Books) and Fire and Forget (Da Capo Press, 2013). He has conducted several interviews with other writers and published them on The Rumpus.

Princeton University named him a Hodder Fellow for the 2015-2016 academic year. In 2018, he headed the five-member jury that awarded the first Aspen Words Literary Prize. In July 2018, Klay was named 2018 winner of the George W. Hunt, S.J., Prize for Journalism, Arts & Letters in the category Cultural & Historical Criticism.

Klay’s first novel, entitled Missionaries, was published by Penguin Press in October 2020. It was included on Barack Obama’s perennial list of his favorite books of the year.

, Klay was a faculty member in the Masters of Fine Arts (MFA) creative writing program at Fairfield University.

In 2022, Klay returned a second time on the Storybound podcast for a special adaptation of his essay "Citizen Soldier".

Personal life
He married Jessica Alvarez, an attorney, on February 15, 2014.

Selected writings

References

External links

 
 Alexander J. Kane, "An Interview With Phil Klay", The Dartmouth Review, May 17, 2014
 Hannah Silverstein, "'A Vital Responsibility': An Interview With Phil Klay '05", December 10, 2014
 PBS NewsHour Interview (video and transcript), November 24, 2014

1983 births
Living people
People from Westchester County, New York
Regis High School (New York City) alumni
Dartmouth College alumni
Hunter College alumni
United States Marine Corps officers
United States Marine Corps personnel of the Iraq War
National Book Award winners
War writers
American military writers
Writers from New York City
21st-century American short story writers
21st-century American non-fiction writers